Stanford Research Systems is a maker of general test and measurement instruments. The company was founded in 1980, is privately held, and is not affiliated with Stanford University.

Stanford Research Systems (SRS) manufactures all of their products at their Sunnyvale, California facility.
SRS produces scientific and engineering instruments for a number of different fields. Many of the products fall under the general category of "signal recovery". These products are primarily sold to industry, university, and government labs, or sold as OEM components to other manufacturers.

Electronic Products

 Analog PID controllers
 Audio analyzers
 Programmable temperature controllers
 Lock-in amplifiers
 Laser-diode controllers
 Low-noise preamplifiers
 High-voltage power supplies
 Gated integrators and boxcar averagers
 Synthesized function and clock generators
 Digital delay and pulse generators
 Frequency counters
 FFT spectrum analyzers
 LCR meters
 Thermocouple monitors
 Programmable filters
 Compact rubidium (atomic) frequency standards

Other Products
 Quartz crystal microbalances
 Melting-point apparatus
 Nitrogen laser
 Optical chopper
 Low-vibration optical shutters
 Vacuum gauges and controllers
 Residual gas analyzers (quadrupole mass spectrometers) and controllers
 Cryogenic temperature-measurement instrumentation

External links
 Stanford Research Systems

Companies established in 1980
Companies based in Sunnyvale, California
Electronics companies of the United States
Electronic test equipment manufacturers